In recent years, Montenegro has increased its efforts to implement preventive and legislative measures needed to curb corruption. For example, anti-bribery provisions in the Criminal Code, as well as laws on money laundering, conflict of interest, access to information, and political funding have all been strengthened, while awareness-raising activities and training of public officials in integrity standards have been intensified.

However, corruption remains a serious problem in the country. The European Commission finds in its Progress Report 2013 that efficiency in the fight against corruption is constrained by frequent legislative changes and the lax attitude among law enforcement authorities to investigate corruption allegations, especially those involving high-level officials.

Areas

Business 
In the World Economic Forum's Global Competitiveness Report 2013–2014, surveyed business executives rank access to financing, corruption and inefficient bureaucracy as the most problematic factors for doing business in Montenegro. Active and passive bribery is prohibited by the Montenegrin Criminal Code, and government officials are subject to more stringent requirements under the Law on the Prevention of Conflict of Interest, which stipulates that they may only receive appropriate gifts of small value (not exceeding the amount of EUR 50).

Government 

On Transparency International's 2021 Corruption Perceptions Index, Montenegro scored 46 on a scale from 0 ("highly corrupt") to 100 ("highly clean"). When ranked by score, Montenegro ranked 64th among the 180 countries in the Index, where the country ranked first is perceived to have the most honest public sector.  For comparison, the best score was 88 (ranked 1), and the worst score was 11 (ranked 180).

See also 
 Crime in Montenegro

References

External links
Montenegro Corruption Profile from the Business Anti-Corruption Portal

Montenegro
Crime in Montenegro by type
Politics of Montenegro